Newberry Mountains can refer to:

Newberry Mountains (California)
Newberry Mountains (Nevada)

See also 
Newberry (disambiguation)